IK Tellus is a Swedish sports club, having teams in football, bandy and handball. The club is located in Tellusborg, Stockholm.

Background
Tellusborgs IF was formed on 11 April 1921 and brought together several disparate groups of youngsters in Tellusborg after much negotiation. However, controversy about the club name remained and at a Sunday meeting at the Dövas Café on 11 April 1923 the name was changed to IK Tellus.

Bandy

Football
Since their foundation IK Tellus has participated mainly in the middle and lower divisions of the Swedish football league system.  The club currently plays in Division 3 Östra Svealand which is the fifth tier of Swedish football. They play their home matches at the Aspuddens IP in Tellusborg.

IK Tellus are affiliated to the Stockholms Fotbollförbund.

Season to season

Handball
The club is also playing handball. The women's handball team played the 1965–1966 season in the Swedish top division.

Footnotes

External links
 IK Tellus – Official club website
 IK Tellus Fotboll – Official football website

Football clubs in Stockholm
Swedish handball clubs
Association football clubs established in 1921
Handball clubs established in 1921
1921 establishments in Sweden
Multi-sport clubs in Sweden